Pochodnia (Polish: Torch, full name: the Association for the Promotion of Culture and Education "Torch") was a cultural association of Poles in Lithuania. The first chairman was Wiktor Budzyński (1924-1935), succeeded by Jan Przeździecki and Czesław Mackiewicz. Its activities included education, libraries, theatre, museums, exhibitions, press and literature. Its most important activity was school and after school education. It managed a number of preschools and private primary schools. In 1935 it managed 19 Polish afterschool cultural centers with over 12,000 participants, and the central library with 115 library outlets.

References

Polish minorities
20th century in Lithuania
1924 establishments in Lithuania